Nil Köksal is a Turkish-born Canadian television and radio journalist, most recently the weekday anchor of World Report on CBC Radio One. In July 2022, she was announced as the new host of As It Happens beginning in September.

Köksal has worked for the Canadian Broadcasting Corporation since 2001, and has been a member of the CBC News: Morning team since November 2005. She graduated from the University of British Columbia with a bachelor's degree and from Ryerson University with a Bachelor of Applied Arts in journalism. She was born in Istanbul, Turkey and raised in both Ontario and Vancouver.

In 2013, she won the Canadian Screen Award for Best Local Breaking News Reportage at the 1st Canadian Screen Awards, for her coverage of the murder of Mariam Makhniashvili.

References

External links
 CBC.ca biography

Canadian television news anchors
Canadian radio news anchors
Canadian television reporters and correspondents
Toronto Metropolitan University alumni
Canadian people of Turkish descent
Turkish emigrants to Canada
Turkish expatriates in Canada
University of British Columbia alumni
Year of birth missing (living people)
Living people
Journalists from British Columbia
Journalists from Toronto
CBC Television people
Canadian women television journalists
People from Vancouver
21st-century Canadian journalists
Canadian women radio journalists
Canadian Screen Award winning journalists
CBC Radio hosts
Canadian talk radio hosts